Phryganopsis plumosa is a moth of the subfamily Arctiinae first described by Paul Mabille in 1900. It is found in the Democratic Republic of the Congo, Malawi, Madagascar, South Africa, Algeria. and southern Spain.

The holotype was collected in 1898 in Madagascar's Antongil Bay by A. Mocquerys.

References
Mabille. (1900). "Lepidoptera nova malgassica et africana". Annales de la Société Entomologique de France. 68 (1899): 723–753.

Moths described in 1900
Lithosiini
Moths of Madagascar
Lepidoptera of Malawi
Moths of Europe
Moths of Africa